Salman Mohamed Hussain (born 19 August 1968) is a Kuwaiti fencer. He competed in the individual and team foil events at the 1988 Summer Olympics.

References

External links
 

1968 births
Living people
Kuwaiti male foil fencers
Olympic fencers of Kuwait
Fencers at the 1988 Summer Olympics